Gabriel Teodoro Martinelli Silva (born 18 June 2001), known as Gabriel Martinelli, is a Brazilian professional footballer who plays as a forward for  club Arsenal and the Brazil national team.

Martinelli began his senior club career playing for Ituano and signed for Arsenal in July 2019, aged 18. He won the FA Cup in his debut season.

At international level, Martinelli represents the Brazil under-23s. He helped Brazil win an Olympic Gold in men's football at the 2020 Summer Olympics. He made his senior debut in 2022 and was part of Brazil's squad at the 2022 FIFA World Cup.

Club career

Ituano
Born in Guarulhos, São Paulo, Martinelli started his career in 2010, playing for Corinthians' futsal team. After making the breakthrough in football fields, he moved to Ituano in 2015, having subsequent trials at Manchester United and Barcelona.

On 4 November 2017, Martinelli signed his first professional contract until October 2022. He made his professional debut the following 17 March, coming on as a late substitute for goalscorer Claudinho in a 2–1 Campeonato Paulista away win against São Bento; at the age of 16 years and nine months, he became the youngest player to play for the club in the century.

Martinelli scored his first senior goal on 8 September 2018, netting the second in a 4–1 win over Taboão da Serra, for the year's Copa Paulista. Definitively promoted to the first team for the 2019 Campeonato Paulista, he scored six goals during the competition, being the club's top goalscorer as they reached the quarterfinals; highlights included a brace in a 3–0 away win against Bragantino on 15 March 2019.

Arsenal
Martinelli was reportedly subject to interest from a number of clubs but signed a long-term contract with Premier League club Arsenal on 2 July 2019, for a reported fee of £6 million (R$46.9 million). Holding an Italian passport, Martinelli was not subject to the scrutinised criteria required for English clubs to sign South American players. He travelled with the Arsenal first team to their pre-season tour in the United States. He scored a goal on his non-competitive debut, in a 3–0 pre-season win against Colorado Rapids on 16 July. Upon signing, Martinelli was originally set to play primarily with the under-21s in his first season, then slowly be integrated from the academy setup to the first-team. However, Martinelli's impressive pre-season and quality in training encouraged Arsenal that he would be ready for immediate first-team integration.

2019–2022: Debut season and breakthrough
Martinelli made his Premier League debut on 11 August 2019 in a 1–0 win against Newcastle United, coming on in the 84th minute as a substitute for Henrikh Mkhitaryan. On 24 September, Martinelli scored a brace in his first competitive start for the club in a 5–0 victory over Championship side Nottingham Forest in the EFL Cup. His performance received praise from head coach Unai Emery, who said: "He's hungry to have that opportunity to help us, he is very humble, he fights. I told him to have some patience for his opportunity to do like he was doing. He did that. He deserved it".

Martinelli made his second start for Arsenal in a 4–0 home win over Standard Liège in the UEFA Europa League on 4 October, in which he scored another brace. Martinelli kept up his goal scoring form, netting the equaliser in a 3–2 home win over Vitória Guimarães on 24 October, with another header. In the League Cup fourth round on 30 October, Martinelli registered another brace in a 5–5 draw with Liverpool, and also scored his penalty in the penalty shootout, which Arsenal eventually lost. As a result, he became the first player to score four times in his first four starts since Ian Wright. Martinelli's performance received praise from Liverpool manager Jürgen Klopp, who labelled him "[the] talent of the century".

Martinelli's performances led to him being awarded the Arsenal 'Player of the Month' award for October, receiving 75% of the total votes cast, beating out Mattéo Guendouzi and Nicolas Pépé. After the appointment of interim head coach Freddie Ljungberg, Martinelli started his first Premier League game, scoring Arsenal's equaliser in an eventual 1–3 win over West Ham United on 9 December. On 21 January 2020, Martinelli scored in a 2–2 away draw at Chelsea, making him the first teenager to reach double figures in a season for Arsenal since Nicolas Anelka. The goal was later voted as Arsenal's Goal of the Season by the club's fans.

On 3 July, Martinelli signed a new four-year contract, with a team option for an extra year, until 2025. Shortly after, Martinelli was ruled out until the end of 2020, undergoing surgery to repair a lesion in the cartilage of his knee following an injury in training on 21 June. He made his return on 19 December, coming off the bench to play 19 minutes in a 2–1 away defeat to Everton. During the warmup against Newcastle United in the FA Cup on 9 January 2021, he sustained a minor ankle injury and was replaced in the line-up by Reiss Nelson. Martinelli returned to playing in European competition on 18 February, making a 13 minute cameo appearance off the bench in a 1–1 draw against Benfica. He scored his first goal of the season in a 3–0 away victory against Sheffield United on 11 April.

Martinelli scored his first goal (a volley with his second touch of the game) of the 2021–22 season against Newcastle United on 27 November. This goal of his was eventually ranked 3rd in the official Goal of the Season poll held by the club at the end of the season.

On 18 December, he scored twice against Leeds United three days later, marking his first Premier League brace, with his first goal marking Arsenal's 7,000th scored in top-division English football. On 10 February 2022, Martinelli was sent off for two yellow cards in the space of four seconds against Wolves. It was his first red card in his career. The red card gained some controversy as he was given two yellow cards in one passage of play, starting with pushing Daniel Podence after a throw in and then a foul against Nélson Semedo.

On 5 August 2022, Martinelli scored for Arsenal in their 2–0 away win at Crystal Palace, becoming the first Brazilian to net a season-opening goal of a Premier League campaign. On 3 February 2023, Martinelli signed a new long-term contract with the club, tying him to the club until 2027.

International career
Martinelli was born in Brazil, and is of Italian descent through his father; he holds dual Brazilian-Italian citizenship. On 20 May 2019, Martinelli was called up by Brazil national team manager Tite to complete preparatory training for the 2019 Copa América. In November 2019, Martinelli appeared for Brazil's under-23 side at the United International Football Festival in Spain.

On 2 July 2021, Martinelli was named in the Brazil squad for the 2020 Summer Olympics. On 3 August, Martinelli scored Brazil's second penalty to help defeat Mexico in the Olympic semi-final, before becoming a gold medallist after Brazil defeated Spain in the final four days later.

He was named in the 25-man senior Brazil squad on 11 March 2022 for the 2022 FIFA World Cup qualifiers against Chile and Bolivia. Martinelli made his international debut when he came off the bench for Vinícius Júnior to play the last 14 minutes of Brazil's 4−0 win over Chile at the Maracana Stadium.

On 7 November 2022, Martinelli was named in the squad for the 2022 FIFA World Cup.

Style of play 
A dynamic and explosive wide forward known for his agile movement, Martinelli can dribble past multiple opponents to create or score goals. Martinelli models himself on Cristiano Ronaldo, a natural template for any goalscoring wide forward.

Career statistics

Club

International

Honours
Arsenal 
FA Cup: 2019–20

Brazil U23 
Summer Olympics: 2020

Individual
Campeonato Paulista Young Player of the Year: 2019
Campeonato Paulista Team of the Year: 2019

References

External links

Profile at the Arsenal F.C. website

2001 births
Living people
People from Guarulhos
Footballers from São Paulo (state)
Brazilian footballers
Association football forwards
Ituano FC players
Arsenal F.C. players
Premier League players
Brazil youth international footballers
Brazil international footballers
2022 FIFA World Cup players
Olympic footballers of Brazil
Footballers at the 2020 Summer Olympics
Olympic medalists in football
Olympic gold medalists for Brazil
Medalists at the 2020 Summer Olympics
Brazilian expatriate footballers
Expatriate footballers in England
Brazilian expatriate sportspeople in England
Brazilian people of Italian descent